Fernando José da Cunha Neto (born 27 January 1993), simply known as Fernando Neto is a Brazilian professional footballer who plays for Operário as a central midfielder He also plays as a left back.

Club career
In 2012, Fernando was promoted to the first team of Fluminense. To get more matches, he spent the 2013–2014 on loan at Portuguese club Paços Ferreira. He made his professional debut against Vitória Guimarães.

References

External links

1993 births
Living people
Brazilian footballers
Association football defenders
Campeonato Brasileiro Série A players
Campeonato Brasileiro Série B players
Brazilian expatriate footballers
Brazilian expatriate sportspeople in Portugal
Expatriate footballers in Portugal
Vila Nova Futebol Clube players
Fluminense FC players
F.C. Paços de Ferreira players
Macaé Esporte Futebol Clube players
Primeira Liga players
Esporte Clube Santo André players
2. Liga (Slovakia) players
FC ŠTK 1914 Šamorín players
Paraná Clube players